The Brandweerinformatiecentrum voor gevaarlijke stoffen/Information Centre for Dangerous Goods (BIG), established in the Flemish city of Geel, collects and validates information on dangerous goods.

History
BIG was established in 1979 following a number of serious environmental disasters in the mid-seventies.  The initial partners were the town of Geel (represented by the local fire service), Katholieke Hogeschool Kempen and the Applied Sciences department of the Katholieke Universiteit Leuven. The aim was to develop an information centre for dangerous goods that could be consulted by fire brigades.

Database
Every year they publish a selection of their chemical database on DVD. This selection, called BIG Kaleidos Database, consists of validated data concerning 20,000 chemical substances and mixtures available in 13 languages. Subscriptions include annual updates. The database contains more than 250 properties, including physico-chemical properties, safety and prevention measures, and transport legislation. Single-user and network versions are available.

At an incident scene it is important to identify the substance as soon as possible and to take the appropriate measures. Information and communication play a vital role. For this reason, BIG developed a Pocket PC application, the Kaleidos Pocket.

Emergency Response Service
BIG is a 24-hour emergency centre for responding to accidents with dangerous goods. In these situations, the supplied information is always free. Belgian and foreign emergency services use this service at chemical accidents scenes. For companies there is a charge for emergency service. Those companies can mention the BIG emergency number on their documents and packaging.
Emergency centre: +32 (0) 14 58 45 45

Safety Data Sheet
BIG develops Safety Data Sheets in accordance with the applicable EU legislation (according to (EC) no. 1907/2006 (REACH, Article 31 and annex II). The sheets are available in several languages. The SAS layouts are also available in accordance with local legislation and the new EU GHS/CLP classification.

Consultancy
BIG can help companies with environmental and other legislation concerning dangerous goods (European Agreement concerning the International Carriage of Dangerous Goods by Road, International Air Transport Association, International Maritime Dangerous Goods Code, Regulations concerning the International Carriage of Dangerous Goods by Rail, etc.). Recently BIG has also started an outsourcing service.

REACH 
Inventory of substances, mixtures and articles
Pre-registration
Data Gap Analysis
Developing chemical safety reports and the technical dossier
Evaluation test data
Exposure and risk Characterisation
PBT/vPvB-assessment
IUCLID 5
Safety data sheet according to REACH
Authorisation application
Consultancy for the SIEF/consortium
To help authorities to develop annex XV dossiers
Third party representative for EU manufacturers
Only representative for non-EU manufacturers

External links 
 Website Brandweerinformatiecentrum voor gevaarlijke stoffen

Warning systems
Chemical safety
Emergency management
International organisations based in Belgium
Organisations based in Antwerp Province
Geel